Itzhak Stern (25 January 1901 – 30 January 1969) was a Polish-Israeli Jewish Holocaust survivor who worked for Sudeten-German industrialist Oskar Schindler and assisted him in his rescue activities during the Holocaust.

Life

Early life 
Stern was born 25 January 1901, in Kraków. He was an important leader in the Jewish community, and was the vice president of the Jewish Agency for Western Poland and a member of the Zionist Central Committee. In 1938, he was engaged to Sophia Backenrot, although the marriage was postponed until after the war.

World War II 
Schindler showed Stern the balance sheet of a company he was thinking of acquiring, an enamelware manufacturer called  Ltd  owned by a consortium of Jewish businessmen (including Abraham Bankier) that had filed for bankruptcy earlier that year. Despite Stern being Jewish and Schindler being a member of the Nazi Party, Schindler was friendly to Stern. Later, Stern said of the meeting:

I did not know what he wanted and I was frightened... [until] December 1st, we Polish Jews had been left more or less alone. They had Aryanized the factories, of course. And if a German asked you a question in the street it was compulsory for you to precede your answer with 'I am a Jew....' But it was only on December 1st that we had to begin wearing the Star of David. It was just as the situation had begun to grow worse for the Jews, when the Sword of Damocles was already over our heads, that I had this meeting with Oskar Schindler.

In a later meeting, Stern informed Schindler that he could use Jewish slave labour to staff his factory,  (German Enamelware Factory) at a lower price than Polish laborers, which would also allow those laborers to be protected from deportations. Schindler followed his suggestion, which began his rescue activities of Jews during the Holocaust.

Kraków's Jews were imprisoned in the Kraków Ghetto six months after German troops invaded Kraków. The ghetto was fully liquidated in 1943. Those considered useful (to be used as slave labour) were sent to Płaszów, including Schindler's workers and Stern. The rest were sent to various death camps across Poland. In Płaszów, Stern and his brother Natan, along with Mietek Pemper and Joseph Bau, were forced to work in Płaszów's office, where they came into frequent contact with the camp's notorious commandant, Amon Göth. Stern helped Pemper in his efforts to prevent the closure and liquidation of Płaszów, knowing that while conditions there were terrible, liquidation likely meant the deaths of every prisoner. Stern kept in contact with Schindler throughout this time and worked to better conditions for the Jews, including transferring workers to Schindler's factory, distributing aid money, and attempting to inform the outside world of their plight.

In 1944, when the closure of Płaszów became inevitable, Schindler decided to open a new factory, the Brünnlitz labor camp, in Brněnec, occupied Czechoslovakia, for his Jewish workers in order to prevent them from being sent to death camps. Stern and the surviving members of his family were placed on the famous list to be transferred to Brünnlitz by Schindler, although Stern's mother died of illness when she, along with the other female , were transferred to Auschwitz before Schindler could arrange their transfer to Brünnlitz. The male , including Stern and Natan, were transported to Gross-Rosen before they were sent to the relative safety of Brünnlitz, where Stern worked directly with Schindler and became one of the leaders of the Jewish workers. Due to his membership in the Nazi Party and service in the Abwehr, Schindler was in danger of being arrested after the defeat of Nazi Germany. Stern and the other Jewish leaders wrote a letter attesting to Schindler's rescue of Jews, which they gave to Schindler before he fled to the Allied lines.

Later life 
After the liberation of the Brünnlitz camp by the Red Army, Stern moved to Paris and eventually emigrated to Israel. He advocated for Schindler to be recognized more broadly, even writing a pamphlet about his rescue activity. Stern remained friends with Schindler for the rest of his life, corresponding with him until his death in 1969. It was reported that Schindler "cried inconsolably" at his funeral.

Personal life 
In 1938, Stern was engaged to Sophia Backenrot, who survived the war due to her Aryan appearance in the Drohobycz ghetto. Their marriage was postponed until the end of the war in 1945. They remained married until Stern's death at the age of 68.

Legacy 
He was portrayed in the 1993 film Schindler's List by English actor Ben Kingsley.

References

1901 births
1969 deaths
Polish Jews in Israel
20th-century Israeli Jews
20th-century Polish Jews
Citizens of Israel through Law of Return
Gross-Rosen concentration camp survivors
Holocaust survivors
Kraków Ghetto inmates
Kraków-Płaszów concentration camp survivors
Polish accountants
Polish expatriates in France
Polish emigrants to Israel
Schindlerjuden
People from Kraków